Phil Hawkins (born December 26, 1984) is a commercial, television and independent film director from Manchester, United Kingdom. His work in feature film includes The Women Of Troy (2006) and Philip Pullman's The Butterfly Tattoo (2008). He is also known for appearing in the Fox/DreamWorks reality television show On The Lot.

Career

Hawkins directed his first short film when he was 13, and admits that it wasn't very good. He had no formal education in film and is entirely self-taught. He learned the film-making trade by taking part in a lot of 48-hour film challenges. When he was 17 he gained a place on the BBC's Mentor Project. With a £1000 fund he made a short called The Dotted Line which got him noticed by a TV advertising production company.

His first feature, The Women Of Troy, won Best Director at the New York Independent Film Festival in 2006.

In late 2006, Hawkins was signed by the Dutch production company Dynamic Entertainment to direct the film version of Philip Pullman's novel The Butterfly Tattoo, The independent film won three awards at international festivals, including Best Director at the New York Independent Film Festival in 2008 - the second time Hawkins has won this award.

In mid-2010, Hawkins shot the film Being Sold in just two days. The film went won Best Film and Best Actor for its lead Christopher Dane at the London Independent Film Festival.

In 2013 Hawkins directed the horror film The Last Showing, starring Robert Englund. The film had a budget of £2m and was shot in the north west of England. It had its world premier in 2014 at Frightfest before being released on DVD and VOD. Englund commented: "You know, it’s so great to work for someone as gifted as Phil Hawkins. After a day and a half of working with him. I was like, “Where’s he been all my life?”"

On The Lot

In 2007, Hawkins was the only filmmaker from the UK selected to appear on the Fox/DreamWorks reality television show On The Lot for filmmakers.   Since the show, Hawkins has signed up with US-based manager Seth Lockhart for features development.

TV commercials

In addition to his film work, Hawkins has directed a number of TV commercials for a wide range of advertising agencies and production companies.

Filmography

Awards

Best Feature Director at the New York Independent Film and Video Festival 2006 for The Woman of Troy
Best Feature Director at the New York Independent Film and Video Festival 2008 for The Butterfly Tattoo

References

External links
Hawkins' official website

1984 births
Living people
Mass media people from Manchester
People from Chorlton-cum-Hardy